One Radio 101.3 (DYWA 101.3 MHz) is an FM station owned and operated by Wave Network. Its studios and transmitter are located at Pier 2, Catbalogan. The frequency is formerly owned by Manila Broadcasting Company.

References

External links
One Radio FB Page

Radio stations in Samar (province)